The Bellanca J-300 was a high wing cabin monoplane used for several trans-atlantic attempts, including a successful 1934 crossing by the Adamowicz brothers.

See also

Bellanca CH-400 Skyrocket

References

J-300
High-wing aircraft